The Royal Guardians were a mutual benevolent society in Canada.  They were organized into lodges and a Grand Lodge which had formerly been the Grand Lodge of The Ancient Order of United Workmen (A.O.U.W.) of Quebec and the Maritime Provinces.  It published a monthly journal called ‘’The Protector’’ which included the monthly dues.
A dispute over the life insurance owned to a member at Columbus Lodge No. 26 in Montreal in 1908 made its way to the Supreme Court of Canada in 1914 as Royal Guardians v. Clarke

References

Ancient Order of United Workmen
1894 establishments in Canada
Organizations based in Canada with royal patronage
Mutual organizations